Hajji Kheder (also Romanized as Ḩājjī Kheder and Ḩājī Kheder) is a village in Samen Rural District, Samen District, Malayer County, Hamadan Province, Iran. At the 2006 census, its population was 60, in 29 families.

References 

Populated places in Malayer County